S71 may refer to:

Submarines 
 , of the Indian Navy
 , of the Israeli Navy

Other uses 
 S71 (Long Island bus)
 Blériot-SPAD S.71, a French biplane fighter
 Savoia-Marchetti S.71, an Italian transport aircraft
 S71, a postcode district for Barnsley, England